Statistics of Emperor's Cup in the 1964 season. The cup was held between January 11 and January 17, 1965.

Overview
It was contested by 10 teams, and Yawata Steel and Furukawa Electric won the championship.

Results

Group A

Group B

Final
 
Yawata Steel 0–0 Furukawa Electric
Yawata Steel and Furukawa Electric won the championship.

References
 NHK

Emperor's Cup
1965 in Japanese football